Ron Jackson Suresha is an American author and anthologist of books centering on gay and bisexual men's subcultures, particularly the Bear community.

Biography
Suresha was born in Detroit, Michigan, and attended grade school in the northwest suburb of Oak Park.

Suresha and his husband (styled "husbear"), Rocco Russo, were legally married in Provincetown, Massachusetts, in October 2004, and received a Connecticut civil union one year later.  They lived until 2011 in New London, Connecticut and now live in New Milford, Connecticut, where Suresha serves as a Justice of the Peace. He has been an ordained minister of the Universal Life Church since 1975.

Suresha's nonfiction anthology, Bears on Bears: Interviews & Discussions (2002), includes 25 dialogues with 57 bear-identified men and bear-lovers from around the world, such as comedian Bruce Vilanch, porn model Jack Radcliffe, and Survivor star Richard Hatch. In the introduction, Suresha asserts that Bears on Bears is "the first interview book ... compiled primarily from online interactions" using online chat technology.

A bisexual-identified man and bi rights advocate, Suresha edited, with Peter Chvany, the nonfiction book Bi Men : Coming Out Every Which Way (2006). Suresha's two bisexual men's anthologies were named finalists in the 2006 Lambda Literary Award for Bisexual Literature.

In 2008, Suresha edited for Journal of Bisexuality a special issue commemorating the sexagennial (60th) anniversary of the publication of Sexual Behavior in the Human Male, commonly known as the Kinsey Report, as Bisexual Perspectives on the Life and Work of Alfred C. Kinsey, which was named a finalist in the 2008 Lambda Literary Awards in Bisexual Literature.

That year, Suresha cofounded Bear Bones Books, an imprint of LGBT publisher Lethe Press, which released a revised edition of his Bears on Bears, including five additional interviews. The imprint also reissued several men's fiction anthologies he edited under the pseudonym R. Jackson. In 2017, Suresha made Bear Bones Books an independent media outlet, reissuing several of his and other's books.

Suresha published in 2011 a folklore collection of humorous tales about the character Nasreddin, The Uncommon Sense of the Immortal Mullah Nasruddin which was named a Storytelling World Honor Title in 2012 in the adult collections category, and which received a 2013 Anne Izard Storytellers' Choice Award.

With Scott McGillivray, Suresha compiled and wrote a 2012 photobook, Fur: The Love of Hair, for German publisher Bruno Gmünder Verlag, which received a Rainbow Book Award.

In 2014, Suresha edited an anthology of poetry written by and for men of the bear community, Hibernation and Other Poems by Bear Bards, which was named a Rainbow Book Award winner in both the LGBTQ Poetry and Bisexuality categories. In 2014 he published a second collection of Nasreddin stories, Extraordinary Adventures of Mullah Nasruddin, named a Lambda Literary Award Finalist.

Suresha identified as a gay man "since puberty" until his forties. After cancer and several other midlife crises, Suresha came out as bisexual. Suresha says that this second coming out was "much more provocative and positive than my first arduous teenage process of self-discovery as gay, but just as much a rollercoaster."

In September 2019, in coordination with an exhibit at the New Milford (Conn.) Historical Society & Museum, Suresha presented an evening lecture on Florence Maybrick, the American woman wrongly accused of poisoning her British husband, entitled The Mystery of the Dress: The Cat Woman of Gaylordsville. Suresha two years later brought proposals before the Town Council of New Milford and the Town of Kent Selectmen, marking the 80th anniversary of Maybrick's October 1941 death in New Milford and burial in South Kent and noting her exoneration; both proposals were accepted, and on October 23, 2021, both towns observed Florence Chandler Maybrick Day.

See also
Bisexual Community
Bisexual Resource Center
Bear community
Nasreddin Hoca

References

External links
 Ron Suresha (website / blog)
 Bear Bones Books
 Mullah Nasruddin

Bisexual men
Bisexual rights activists
Jewish American writers
American LGBT rights activists
LGBT people from Michigan
American non-fiction writers
Living people
Bear (gay culture)
Year of birth missing (living people)
21st-century American Jews
American bisexual writers